Alfredo dos Santos (January 1, 1920 – October 23, 1997), best known as Alfredo II, was a Brazilian footballer in midfielder role. He was born in Rio de Janeiro.

During his career (1937–1956), he played for Vasco da Gama, except one year with Flamengo (1949). As another Alfredo played in Vasco, he earned the nickname "Alfredo Segundo" ("Alfredo the Second", transcribed as Alfredo II). He won five Carioca Tournaments (1945, 1947, 1949, 1950 and 1952) and the South American Club Championship in 1948. For the Brazilian team he played at the 1950 FIFA World Cup, starting one match against Switzerland (2–2) on June 28, 1950, when he scored a goal in the third minute.

References
Some sources list him as "Alfredo Ramos dos Santos", confusing him with Alfredo Ramos, who played in the 1954 FIFA World Cup.

1920 births
1997 deaths
Footballers from Rio de Janeiro (city)
Brazilian footballers
1950 FIFA World Cup players
Association football midfielders
Brazil international footballers
CR Vasco da Gama players
CR Flamengo footballers